The red-winged grey warbler (Drymocichla incana) is a species of bird in the family Cisticolidae. It is monotypic within the genus Drymocichla.
It is found in Cameroon, Central African Republic, Democratic Republic of the Congo, South Sudan, and Uganda.
Its natural habitats are moist savanna and subtropical or tropical moist shrubland.

References

Ryan, Peter (2006). Family Cisticolidae (Cisticolas and allies). pp. 378–492 in del Hoyo J., Elliott A. & Christie D.A. (2006) Handbook of the Birds of the World. Volume 11. Old World Flycatchers to Old World Warblers'' Lynx Edicions, Barcelona 

red-winged grey warbler
Birds of Central Africa
red-winged grey warbler
Taxonomy articles created by Polbot